Arlan Lerio (born 22 November 1976) is a Filipino boxer. He competed in the men's flyweight event at the 2000 Summer Olympics.

He was part of the national training pool of the Amateur Boxing Association of the Philippines as early as 1997 and won gold medals in international tournaments in England, Estonia, and Finland. Following his achievement of winning a gold medal in the  Liverpool International Festival of Amateur Boxing in 1991, he was taken in as part of a boxing team by then-North Cotabato Governor Manny Piñol where his father Danilo Lerio Sr. served as coach of the team.

In 2001, he reportedly had plans on turning pro with then North Cotabato Governor Piñol as his manager.

Lerio has an younger brother named Danilo who also competed in the 2000 Summer Olympics.

References

External links
 

1976 births
Living people
Filipino male boxers
Olympic boxers of the Philippines
Boxers at the 2000 Summer Olympics
Place of birth missing (living people)
Boxers at the 1998 Asian Games
Asian Games competitors for the Philippines
Flyweight boxers